The Chief of the General Staff is the chief of the General Staff and Albanian Armed Forces. The chief of staff is appointed by the President of Albania, who is the commander-in-chief. The position was established on 4 May 1913 as part of the Provisional Government of Albania.

List of chiefs of the general staff

Provisional Government of Albania / Principality of Albania
Date of term's end is based on start of successor's term.

Albanian Republic / Albanian Kingdom
In 1925, Prime Minister Ahmet Zogolli created a new constitution for Albania, forming the Albanian Republic. On 1 September 1928, Zogolli amended the constitution, dissolved parliament, and proclaimed himself King, creating the Albanian Kingdom. The Kingdom collapsed following the Italian invasion of Albania.

|-
!colspan="8"|Albanian National Army
|-

|-
!colspan="6"|Royal Albanian Army
!King of Albania
!
|-

Communist Albania
The following individuals served during the era of communism in Albania, serving the National Liberation Movement, the Democratic Government of Albania, and the People's Socialist Republic of Albania. In this time, the powers of Commander-in-chief were held by the First Secretary of the Party of Labour of Albania.

|-
!colspan="8"|Albanian National Liberation Army
|-

|-
!colspan="8"|Albanian People's Army
|-

Republic of Albania
The following individuals served following the fall of communism in Albania and the formation of the Republic of Albania. The new Albanian constitution shifted the powers of Commander in Chief to the newly formed office of the President of Albania.

See also
 General Staff of the Armed Forces (Albania)
 Albanian Armed Forces

Notes

References

External links
Former Chiefs of the Albanian General Staff 1913–2013

Albania
Albanian generals
Albania
Lists of Albanian people